The black-fronted brushfinch or black-fronted brush finch (Atlapetes nigrifrons) is a species of bird in the family Passerellidae, the New World sparrows. It is found in the Perijá Mountains of northern Colombia and northwestern Venezuela.

Taxonomy and systematics

The Handbook of the Birds of the World (HBW) and the Clements taxonomy consider the black-fronted brushfinch a subspecies of yellow-breasted brushfinch (Atlapetes latinuchus) but state that "[f]uture treatments may consider this taxon a valid species". The International Ornithological Congress (IOC) has accepted it as a full species.

Description

The adult is dark gray above and yellow below with dark wings and tail. The forehead ("front") and sides of the face are black and the crown and nape reddish-orange. The juvenile is similarly colored but does not have the reddish-orange crown.

Distribution and habitat

The black-fronted brushfinch is found only in the Serranía de Perijá, which straddles the border of northern Colombia and western Venezuela. It prefers shrubby edges and second growth forest and appears to tolerate disturbed habitats.

Behavior and ecology

The black-fronted brushfinch's diet and foraging behavior have not been described but are believed to be the same as those of the yellow-breasted brushfinch. The latter species is believed to usually forage on the ground but also in trees. It forages primarily in pairs or small groups and seldom in mixed-species flocks.

Little information is available about its breeding behavior. Observers have noted adults in breeding condition between January and June and have seen juveniles in August.

Status

The species has a very restricted range, and due to physical and political difficulties in accessing the area little is known about its abundance. The area has suffered extensive deforestation whose effect on the species is unknown, though it does appear to tolerate some disturbance. The IUCN considers the black-fronted brushfinch to be of least concern

References

Birds described in 1940
Atlapetes
Near threatened animals